Valentyn Slyusar (born 15 September 1977) is a former Ukrainian footballer who played as a midfielder.

Club career
Slyusar is graduate of Dynamo Kyiv academy. Since then he has played for various Ukrainian First League clubs. He has also played for Russian club FC Rostov.
Notably he has played for Ukrainian Premier League clubs FC Metalurh Donetsk, and Zakarpattia Uzhhorod.

In 2005, Slyusar came to Metalist who got new manager Myron Markevych. Since then he has one three bronze titles with the club in the Ukrainian Premier League.

After the Ukrainian Premier League 2008-09 season Slyusar was found positive in random drug testing and will be suspended for two months.

International career
Slyusar was first called up to the Ukraine national football team by Oleksiy Mykhailychenko for a friendly match against Norway on 19 November 2008. The squad mainly consisted of domestic-based players, with the exception Vitaliy Fedoriv.

Personal life
His son Denys, born in 2002, is also a football player.

References

External links
Profile on Official Metalist website
 

1977 births
Living people
Ukrainian footballers
Ukrainian expatriate footballers
Ukraine international footballers
FC Metalist Kharkiv players
FC Metalurh Donetsk players
FC Rostov players
FC Oleksandriya players
FC Hoverla Uzhhorod players
FC Obolon-Brovar Kyiv players
Doping cases in association football
Expatriate footballers in Russia
Footballers from Kyiv
Russian Premier League players
Ukrainian Premier League players
FC Nyva Vinnytsia players
Association football midfielders